SS Benjamin Contee was an American Liberty Ship type EC2-S-C1 built in 1942 by the Delta Shipbuilding in New Orleans, Louisiana as part of the Emergency Shipbuilding Program for World War II. She was laid down on February 2, 1942, launched on June 15, 1942, and completed on August 7, 1942. She was operated by the Mississippi Shipping Company for the War Shipping Administration as a United States Merchant Marine ship. She was a Maritime Commission design. Most Liberty ships were named after prominent deceased Americans. She was converted from a cargo ship to a troop transport ship. She is named after Benjamin Contee, an American Episcopal priest and statesman from Maryland. He was an officer in the American Revolutionary War, a delegate to the Confederation Congress, and a member of the first United States House of Representatives.

World War II
Benjamin Contee took part in convoy ON-187, a Liverpool - Halifax, Nova Scotia trip. The Convoy departed on June 1, 1943, and arrived at New York on June 15. To support Britain, the ship operated under the Combined Shipping Adjustment Board. At the request of Britain, the Benjamin Contee was used to transport Italian prisoners of War from El Alamein, Egypt to Oran, Algeria. With 1,800 Italian POWs onboard and just 23 minutes out of El Alamein in the Mediterranean Sea on the night of August 16, 1943, she was hit by a Nazi Germany aircraft-dropped aerial torpedo 16 miles north of Bone, Algeria. The explosion killed 264 and injured 142 of the 1,800 Italian POWs on board. There were no casualties to the crew of 43 Merchant Marines, 27 US Navy Armed Guard, 26 British guards, and 7 Army security detail. It was a harrowing experience for the POWs in the cargo holds. Many of the POWs later would join the Allies Italian Service Units. The torpedo hit in cargo holds No. 1 and No. 2, which flooded quickly. The able Italian POWs went to the lifeboats, but they did not know how to lower them; some jumped overboard thinking the ship was sinking. The flooding of holds 1 and 2 caused the bow to start to sink and rudder and propeller to rise out of the water. Cargo holds 4 and 5 were flooded so that the propeller was back in the water, thus the ship could continue. 
Under her own power, she was able to continue to Bone, Algeria for temporary repairs. The ship received permanent repairs at Gibraltar to fix the 25- by 21-foot hole in her side. After repairs, she returned to New York City and returned to Southampton.

On March 14, 1944, she took part in convoy SC-155 (Liverpool-Halifax). SC-155 was a convoy of slower ships, traveling at 4 knots. She joined SC-155 as she was not able to travel at her top speed of 11 knots after her damage. They departed Halifax on March 14, 1944, and arrived at Liverpool on the 29th.

Normandy Landings (D-Day)
Due to the ship's damage, she was selected to help with the Normandy landings; she was used as a sea breakwater by scuttling on the June 8, 1944, in position Gooseberry No. 1 in Mulberry Harbour off of Utah Beach, Normandy at the beachhead. She was damaged more by a severe storm on 19–22 June 1944. On July 16, 1944, she was declared a complete loss and officially abandoned. Nine other ships were scuttled to form Gooseberry 1. Some of the other ships were the David O. Saylor, George S. Wasson, Matt W. Ransom, Willis A. Slater, Victory Sword and Vitruvius.

Awards
Captain Even Evenson, Master of the SS Benjamin, was given the Merchant Marine Distinguished Service Medal by the President of the United States for distinguished service in the line of duty. Captain Evensen help calm the panicked prisoners and performed correct flood control to save the ship. This showed courage, seamanship, and discipline in the United States Merchant Marine. Admiral Emory Scott Land presented the award.

See also
 Allied technological cooperation during World War II
 Empire ships
 List of Liberty ships
 Fort ship
 Park ships
 Type C1 ship
 Type C2 ship
 Type T2 tanker
 Victory ship
 U.S. Merchant Marine Academy

References

 

Liberty ships
Ships built in New Orleans
SS Benjamin Contee